Tuffé is a former commune in the Sarthe department in the region of Pays de la Loire in north-western France. On 1 January 2016, it was merged into the new commune of Tuffé-Val-de-la-Chéronne.

The grammarian and lexicographer Pierre-Roland-François Butet (1769–1825) was born in Tuffé.

See also
Communes of the Sarthe department

References

Former communes of Sarthe